The 350th Air Refueling Squadron is a United States Air Force unit assigned to the 22nd Air Refueling Wing at McConnell Air Force Base, Kansas. It operates Boeing KC-135 Stratotanker aircraft conducting aerial refueling missions.

Mission
To organize, train and equip to provide global mobility, 24 hours per day, 7 days per week.

History

World War II

Organization and Training for Combat

The squadron was originally established as one of the original Boeing B-17 Flying Fortress heavy bombardment squadrons of the 100th Bombardment Group in mid-1942 under Third Air Force, but was immediately transferred to Second Air Force for training. It remained a paper unit until the initial cadre of the ground echelon (4 officers and 27 enlisted men) were assigned at Gowen Field, Idaho. Two days later, the squadron departed for Walla Walla Army Air Base, Washington for Phase I training. There the first aircrew arrived on 1 December 1942.

In February 1943, the ground echelon went to Kearney AAF, Nebraska, while the air echelon went to Ainsworth, Casper and Scottsbluff Army Air Fields, where they acted as instructors training other units for the next three months. On 28 April, Colonel Alkire, the first group commander was relieved of duty. Two days later, the air echelon returned to Wendover Field, and would not be reunited with the ground echelon until arriving in England in June.

The flight echelon ferried their aircraft through Maine, Newfoundland, Labrador and Iceland to the United Kingdom.

Combat in the European Theater
The 350th engaged in strategic bombardment operations over Occupied Europe and Germany, sustaining very heavy losses of personnel and aircraft while conducting many unescorted missions over enemy territory attacking airfields, industries, naval facilities and transportation hubs. The squadron flew its first mission against Bremen, Germany on 25 June 1943. During the summer of 1944, aircrews bombed enemy positions at Saint-Lô, followed by similar campaigns at Brest in August and September. In October 1944, the squadron attacked enemy and ground defenses in the allied drive on the Siegfried Line, then bombed marshaling yards, German occupied villages, and communication targets in the Ardennes during the Battle of the Bulge from December 1944 to January 1945. Attacked enemy targets in Germany during the spring of 1945, ending combat operations a strike on Berlin on 20 April 1945.

The squadron remained in Europe as part of the United States Air Forces in Europe occupation forces, dropping food to the people in the west of the Netherlands, and in June transported French Allied former prisoners of war from Austria to France. Demobilizing in England, in December 1945 the squadron inactivated as a paper unit.

Cold War

Reserve organization

The 350th activated in the Air Force Reserve in 1947 at Columbia AAB, South Carolina. It is unclear whether or not the unit was manned or equipped. It was inactivated in 1949 when Continental Air Command reorganized its reserve organization according to the Wing Base Organization.

Strategic Air Command

The squadron reactivated under Strategic Air Command in 1956, and received new, swept wing Boeing B-47 Stratojet, which was designed to carry nuclear weapons and to penetrate Soviet air defenses with its high operational ceiling and near supersonic speed. The squadron flew the B-47 for about a decade when by the mid-1960s it had become obsolete and vulnerable to new Soviet air defenses. The squadron began to send its Stratojets to The Military Aircraft Storage and Disposition Center at Davis-Monthan AFB for retirement in 1965, the last being retired in 1966; it was one of the last B-47 squadrons.

It was redesignated as a strategic reconnaissance squadron, operating Ryan AQM-34 Firebee strategic reconnaissance drones launched from DC-130 Hercules aircraft and recovered by Sikorsky CH-3 helicopters from 1966–1976.

Transitioning to the KC-135Q Stratotanker in 1982, the squadron provided refueling support for SR-71 aircraft from, 1983–1990. The 350th also provided cargo support and intratheater refueling during combat in Southwest Asia from August 1990 – March 1991 during the Gulf War.

Modern Era

At the end of the Cold War, the Air Force underwent extensive changes as a result of several rounds of Base Realignment and Closure (BRAC). On 1 January 1994, the 22nd Air Refueling Wing was assigned to McConnell Air Force Base, Kansas, as part of the Air Force's plan to return McConnell AFB to an air refueling hub. The 384th Air Refueling Squadron, a geographically separated unit of the 19th Air Refueling Wing (at Robins Air Force Base, Georgia) and a McConnell tenant unit, joined the 22 ARW as the first of four Boeing KC-135 Stratotanker squadrons to comprise the wing’s new tanker force. Within eight months, the 350th, 344th, and 349th Air Refueling Squadrons joined the 384th in the 22nd Operations Group to fly the wing's 48 KC-135s. In 1997, the Republic of Singapore Air Force (RSAF) selected McConnell as its training base for its KC-135 crews and maintenance personnel. The RSAF stationed two of their Stratotankers with the 22 ARW, naming the organization the Peace Guardian Detachment. From 1998 to 2003, the RSAF maintained a 300-person detachment at McConnell and trained with the 350th on air refueling techniques, tactics, and general airmanship.

Global War on Terrorism
After the September 11, 2001 terrorist attacks against the United States, the Pentagon launched the Global War On Terrorism (GWOT). The 22nd Air Refueling Wing at McConnell AFB initially deployed tanker crews in support of Operation Noble Eagle (ONE). Before the end of the year, McConnell tankers were sent to the Middle East, Central Asia, Horn of Africa, and other locations to provide aerial refueling support during Operation Enduring Freedom. Beginning in 2003, the 22nd ARW took an active role in Operation Iraqi Freedom as tanker crews deployed to the Arabian Peninsula.

Lineage
 Constituted as the 350 Bombardment Squadron (Heavy) on 28 January 1942
 Activated on 1 June 1942
 Redesignated 350 Bombardment Squadron, Heavy on 20 August 1943
 Inactivated on 15 December 1945
 Redesignated 350 Bombardment Squadron, Very Heavy on 9 July 1947
 Activated in the Reserve on 16 July 1947
 Inactivated on 27 June 1949
 Redesignated 350 Bombardment Squadron, Medium on 1 August 1955
 Activated on 1 January 1956
 Redesignated 350 Strategic Reconnaissance Squadron on 25 June 1966
 Inactivated on 1 July 1976
 Redesignated 350 Air Refueling Squadron, Heavy on 19 January 1982
 Activated on 28 January 1982
 Redesignated 350 Air Refueling Squadron on 1 September 1991

Assignments
 100th Bombardment Group: 1 June 1942 – 15 December 1945
 100th Bombardment Group: 16 July 1947 – 27 June 1949
 100th Bombardment (later, 100 Strategic Reconnaissance) Wing, 1 January 1956 – 1 July 1976 (attached to Sixteenth Air Force, 4 March 1958 – 4 April 1958
 100th Air Refueling Wing, 28 January 1982
 9th Strategic Reconnaissance Wing, 15 March 1983
 9th Operations Group, 1 September 1991
 43d Operations Group, 1 October 1993
 22d Operations Group, 1 July 1994 – Present

Stations
 Orlando Army Air Base, Florida 1 June 1942
 Barksdale Field, Louisiana, c. 18 June 1942
 Pendleton Field, Oregon c. 26 June 1942
 Gowen Field, Idaho, 28 August 1942
 Walla Walla Army Air Base, Washington, c. 1 November 1942
 Wendover Field, Utah, c. 30 November 1942
 Sioux City Army Air Base, Iowa, c. 28 December 1942
 Kearney AAF, Nebraska, c. 30 January 1943 – May 1943
 RAF Thorpe Abbotts (USAAF Station 139), England, 9 June 1943 – December 1945
 Camp Kilmer, New Jersey, c. 20 – 21 December 1945
 Columbia Army Air Base, South Carolina, 16 July 1947 – 27 June 1949
 Portsmouth (later, Pease) AFB, New Hampshire, 1 January 1956 – 30 April 1966 (deployed to RAF Brize Norton, England 4 January 1958 – 4 March 1958 and to Torrejon Air Base, Spain 4 March 1958 – 4 April 1958
 Davis–Monthan Air Force Base, Arizona, 25 June 1966 – 1 July 1976
 Beale Air Force Base, California, 25 January 1982
 McConnell Air Force Base, Kansas, 1 July 1994 – Present

Aircraft and Missile
 Boeing B-17 Flying Fortress, 1942–1945
 North American AT-6 Texan, 1947–1949
 Beechcraft AT-7 Navigator, 1947–1949
 Beechcraft AT-11 Kansan, 1947–1949
 Boeing B-47 Stratojet, 1956–1966
 Sikorsky CH-3, 1966–1976
 Lockheed DC-130 Hercules, 1966–1976
 Ryan AQM-34 Firebee, 1966–1976
 Boeing KC-135 Stratotanker, 1982 – present

References
 Explanatory notes

 Citations

Bibliography

 
 Maurer, Maurer (1983). Air Force Combat Units of World War II. Maxwell AFB, AL: Office of Air Force History. .

See also

Military units and formations in Kansas
Air refueling squadrons of the United States Air Force
Units and formations of Strategic Air Command
1942 establishments in Florida